Sardis is a small village in Pembrokeshire, belonging to the Community of Saundersfoot. It lies just south of Stepaside and northwest of Wisemans Bridge. The area is busier during the summer months when tourists stay at the nearby caravan parks in Wisemans Bridge and Amroth. It contains a small chapel called Sardis Congregational Church, established in 1825 in the northern part of the village.

References

Villages in Pembrokeshire